The Chiri River is a river in the northern part of Bangladesh. It passes through Joypurhat District in the Rajshahi Division.

References 

Chiri River
Rivers of Rajshahi Division